Georgi Mechedzhiev  (Bulgarian: Георги Мечеджиев; born 27 April 1978 in Yambol) is a Bulgarian football coach and former player who is the current head coach of Svoboda Peshtera.

As a player, Mechedzhiev mainly played as a right-back. He played more than 250 games in the Bulgarian League, appearing in the competition for Beroe Stara Zagora, Neftochimic Burgas, Spartak Varna, Slavia Sofia, Lokomotiv Plovdiv and Montana.

Managerial career
On 28 June 2017, Mechedzhiev was appointed as head coach of Third League club Svoboda Peshtera.

References

External links
 

1978 births
Living people
Bulgarian footballers
Association football defenders
First Professional Football League (Bulgaria) players
PFC Beroe Stara Zagora players
Neftochimic Burgas players
PFC Spartak Varna players
PFC Slavia Sofia players
PFC Lokomotiv Plovdiv players
FC Montana players
FC Botev Vratsa players
Bulgarian football managers
People from Yambol